USS Tritonia was a 202-ton steamer commissioned by the Union Navy during the American Civil War.

She served the Union Navy’s struggle against the Confederate States of America in a variety of ways:  as a tugboat, a patrol gunboat, a dispatch boat, a salvage ship, a minesweeper, and as a small (202 ton) transport.

Steamer constructed in Connecticut in 1863 

Tritonia—a side-wheel steamer built as Sarah S. B. Gary in 1863 at East Haddam, Connecticut—was purchased by the Navy at Hartford, Connecticut, on 1 December 1863; and commissioned at the New York Navy Yard on 23 April 1864.

Civil War operations

Clearing mines and debris in Virginia’s James River 

The division patrolled the river to keep it clear of Confederate vessels, torpedoes (mines), and fire rafts.

Assigned to the West Gulf blockade 

On 26 July, Tritonia left the division for duty with the West Gulf Blockading Squadron. She arrived in Mississippi Sound on 5 August, the day of Admiral David Farragut's victory in Mobile Bay, and spent the remainder of the month operating as a dispatch vessel between New Orleans, Louisiana, and that historic body of water.

Destroying valuable salt works 

On 8 and 9 September, boat crews from Tritonia, and Army transport  destroyed several large Confederate salt works at Salt House Point in Bon Secours Bay, Alabama.

As they returned to Mobile Bay on 11 September, the vessels were fired upon but suffered no casualties.

Continued blockade duty along the Gulf 

Tritonia resumed blockade duty, towing the captured schooner Medora to New Orleans, Louisiana, on 15 December for adjudication. She then operated in Mobile Bay until the end of the war and later at Pensacola, Florida, and New Orleans, Louisiana.

Post-war services with U.S. Army troops 

On 29 January 1866, Tritonia carried a company of U.S. Army troops up the Tombigbee River and recaptured the steamer Belfast which had been seized by guerrillas and taken up that stream. The joint expedition also recovered the steamer's cargo of cotton and captured five guerrillas as well.

Decommissioning, sale and subsequent maritime career 

Tritonia was sold at public auction at New York City on 5 October 1866; redocumented as Belle Brown on 19 November; and lost at sea in 1880.

References  

Ships of the Union Navy
Ships built in Connecticut
Steamships of the United States Navy
Tugs of the United States Navy
Gunboats of the United States Navy
Dispatch boats of the United States Navy
Rescue and salvage ships of the United States Navy
American Civil War patrol vessels of the United States
American Civil War auxiliary ships of the United States
1863 ships
Minesweepers of the United States Navy